Nadine Stanton (born 11 September 1975 in Hamilton, New Zealand) is a shooting competitor for New Zealand. At the 2002 Commonwealth Games she won a gold team medal in the  Double Trap (Pairs) event partnering Teresa Borrell, and a silver team medal in the Double Trap.

She competed at the 2002 Commonwealth Games 2004 Summer Olympics, 2006 Commonwealth Games, 2008 Summer Olympics and 2010 Commonwealth Games.

References

1975 births
Living people
New Zealand female sport shooters
Trap and double trap shooters
Olympic shooters of New Zealand
Shooters at the 2002 Commonwealth Games
Shooters at the 2006 Commonwealth Games
Shooters at the 2010 Commonwealth Games
Commonwealth Games gold medallists for New Zealand
Commonwealth Games silver medallists for New Zealand
Shooters at the 2004 Summer Olympics
Shooters at the 2008 Summer Olympics
Commonwealth Games medallists in shooting
Medallists at the 2002 Commonwealth Games
Medallists at the 2006 Commonwealth Games